Dicyclohexylamine is a secondary amine with the chemical formula HN(C6H11)2. It is a colorless liquid, although commercial samples can appear yellow.  It has a fishy odor, typical for amines. It is sparingly soluble in water. As an amine, it is an organic base and useful precursor to other chemicals.

Synthesis 
Dicyclohexylamine, as a mixture with cyclohexylamine, is prepared by the catalytic hydrogenation of aniline (phenylamine), with a catalyst of ruthenium and/or palladium. This method produces mainly cyclohexylamine with little dicyclohexylamine.  Better results have been reported when the catalyst is applied to a support of niobic acid and/or tantalic acid.  It is also obtained by reductive amination of cyclohexanone with ammonia or cyclohexylamine.
 
Dicyclohexylamine may also be prepared by pressure hydrogenation of diphenylamine using a ruthenium catalyst, or by the reaction of cyclohexanone with cyclohexylamine in the presence of a palladium/carbon catalyst under a hydrogen pressure of about 4 mm Hg.

Applications 
Dicyclohexylamine has applications that are similar to those of cyclohexylamine, namely the production of:
antioxidants in rubber and plastics
vulcanization accelerators for rubber
corrosion inhibitors in steam pipes and boilers
agrochemicals
textile chemicals
catalysts for flexible polyurethane foams

References

External links 
 Dicyclohexylamine

Amines
Cyclohexyl compounds